Lion Mums 2 is a Singaporean drama produced by Mediacorp. Lion Mums 2 aired on Mediacorp Channel 5 from 9 August 2017 to 28 September 2017, Mondays to Thursdays from 10:00pm to 11:00pm. The debut episode aired on 9 August 2017 from 9:30pm to 10:30pm. It stars Bernice Liu, Lina Ng, Nurul Aini and Vanessa Vanderstraaten.

Cast

Main Casts

Supporting Casts

Trivia
This is Lina Ng's first English drama series.

References

Mediacorp
Singaporean television series